Antonín Nič (born 22 November 1905, date of death unknown) was a Czech wrestler. He competed for Czechoslovakia in the men's freestyle bantamweight at the 1936 Summer Olympics.

References

External links
 
 

1905 births
Year of death missing
Czech male sport wrestlers
Olympic wrestlers of Czechoslovakia
Wrestlers at the 1936 Summer Olympics
People from Vamberk
Sportspeople from the Hradec Králové Region